Ashton Cokayne Shallenberger (December 23, 1862 – February 22, 1938) was an American Democratic politician and the 15th Governor of Nebraska from 1909 to 1911.

Early life and education
Shallenberger was born in Toulon, Illinois, on December 23, 1862. He was educated in the public schools and attended the University of Illinois at Urbana–Champaign. He was married to Eliza Zilg in 1885 and they had two children.

Career
After a move to Stromsburg, Polk County, Nebraska, in 1881, Shallenberger became a clerk, a banker and a rancher. He moved to Alma, Harlan County, Nebraska, in 1887 and founded the Bank of Alma. He was first elected to the 57th United States Congress but failed to be reelected in 1902.

According to Southwest Virginia folklore, in 1902 Shallenberger, Alma Journal editor H. S. Wetherald, and carriage dealer Frank Griggsby, were startled by the apparition of a Woman in Black.

His first attempt at the Governorship came in 1906, running under a Fusion label of the state Democratic and Populist parties, where he lost to Republican George L. Sheldon. He was then elected governor in 1908, defeating Sheldon in a narrowly won rematch. Shallenberger served from 1909 to 1911, his tenure included the adoption of the State Guarantee of Deposits Law and the "Oregon Plan", a direct primary bill regarding the election of United States Senators. He lost an attempt at a second term in 1910, losing in the Democratic primary to James Charles Dahlman.

Unsuccessful in running for Senate from Nebraska in 1912, Shallenberger was elected a congressman to the 64th and 65th congresses (1915–1919), but was unsuccessful in being reelected to the 66th in 1918. He was a delegate to the Democratic National Convention in 1920, and was elected to the 68th, 69th, and 70th congresses from 1923 to 1929. Unsuccessful in being reelected to the 71st in 1929, but was successful in running for the 72nd and 73rd (1931–1935). He failed to be renominated in 1934, and returned to banking and breeding shorthorn cattle. Shallenberger was one of four governors (three of Nebraska, one of Wyoming) to come from the city of Osceola, Nebraska.

Death
Shallenberger died on February 22, 1938, and is interred at Alma Cemetery, in Alma, Nebraska.

References

External links
 
 
 
 
 
 
 

|-

1862 births
1938 deaths
People from Toulon, Illinois
University of Illinois Urbana-Champaign alumni
People from Stromsburg, Nebraska
People from Alma, Nebraska
Democratic Party governors of Nebraska
Democratic Party members of the United States House of Representatives from Nebraska
People from Osceola, Nebraska